is a train station in Yodogawa-ku, Osaka, Osaka Prefecture, Japan.

Layout
Kanzakigawa is aground level station. It is served by two side platforms serving two tracks.

History
The station opened on 16 July 1920, simultaneously with the opening of the Kobe Main Line.

Station numbering was introduced on 21 December 2013, with Kanzakigawa being designated as station number HK-04.

References

External links 

 Station website (in Japanese)

Railway stations in Osaka Prefecture
Hankyū Kōbe Main Line
Railway stations in Japan opened in 1920